Freese is a surname of Frisian origin. Notable people with the surname include:

David Freese (born 1983), American professional baseball player
Gene Freese (1934–2013), American professional baseball player
George Freese (1926–2014), American professional baseball player
Hermann Freese, 19th-century German painter
Jason Freese (born 1975), American band musician
Jeremy Freese (born 1971), American sociologist
Josh Freese (born 1972), American session drummer and songwriter
Katherine Freese (contemporary), American theoretical astrophysicist
Stephen Freese American politician
Stan Freese (born 1945), American tuba player
Ulrich Freese (born 1951), German politician
Louis Freese (aka B-Real), American rap artist

Surnames of Frisian origin